The Jewish Council for Racial Equality (JCORE) is a Jewish organization that works to provide a Jewish voice on race and asylum issues in the UK.

JCORE aims to deliver race-equality education for all ages, provide action to support refugees and asylum seekers, promote Black-Asian-Jewish dialogue, and campaign on race and asylum issues.

It works with organizations like CCJO René Cassin, Hope not Hate, British Red Cross, Unite Against Fascism, The Baobab Centre for Young Survivors, The Children's Society, Freedom from Torture, The Refugee Council and the British Medical Association.

History
The Jewish Council for Racial Equality was founded in 1976 by Dr. Edie Friedman. Originally named the Jewish Social Responsibility Council (JSRC), it was renamed in 1994, becoming The Jewish Council for Racial Equality (JCORE). Dr. Friedman wanted to create an organization that would give “full expression to the concern, as Jews, for justice both in the UK and in the Third World." As the JSRC developed, it began to focus on specific areas such as education of the Jewish community, developing black-Jewish dialogue, and working with refugees.

Mission
The Jewish Council for Racial Equality believes that "a concern for social justice should be an integral part of Jewish identity and its relationship with the rest of society."

JCORE asserts that it is therefore necessary for Jews in the UK to speak out against racism and for the rights of asylum seekers and refugees because they know what happens when others stand by and do nothing.

Work

JCORE works in three main areas:

Race equality education

Educating both the Jewish community and beyond about issues of race equality.

Black-Asian-Jewish Dialogue

promoting knowledge and understanding between different minority groups.
 
uniting various groups within society so that they might educate and enrich each other's lives.

encouraging the commitment of the Jewish community to the above and stimulating their active involvement in its pursuit.

Refugees and asylum issues

Providing help and support to asylum seekers and those granted refugee status or allowed to remain through the provision of donations, vocational training, advice, and befriending

Advocating and campaigning at all levels to help alleviate suffering and poverty amongst asylum seekers in the UK and to encourage an approach that makes sure the UK abides by its international responsibility and the Refugee Convention.

encouraging the commitment of the Jewish community to the above and facilitating their active involvement in its pursuit.

Current projects

JUMP

In 2007, JCORE launched JUMP (JCORE Unaccompanied Minors Project). Inspired by the Kindertransport that brought Jewish children out of Germany and Austria to safety in Britain in 1938/39, JUMP brings young asylum seekers and refugees together with volunteer befrienders, offering support through one-to-one sessions and group activities.

Refugee Doctors Mentoring Scheme

Running since 2013, JCORE's Refugee Doctors Mentoring Scheme pairs refugee doctors with UK-trained doctors who can mentor them and help them requalify so that they are able to practice in the UK. The project builds on the work JCORE has been doing since the 1980s to help refugee doctors in the UK.

No Way To Live

No Way to Live is a JCORE campaign to end the causes of destitution among asylum seekers. It is part of Still Human, Still Here, a coalition of over 60 organizations that are dedicated to highlighting the plight of tens of thousands of refused asylum seekers in the UK and campaigning to end destitution amongst them.

JCORE Support

JCORE Support provides destitute asylum seekers with help in their day-to-day lives. JCORE collects clothes, shoes, diapers, foods, toiletries, and anything else that is needed by asylum seeker drop-in centers in London.

Publications

Let's Make a Difference: Teaching Anti-Racism in Primary Schools—A Jewish Perspective↵ Dr Edie Friedman, Hazel Woolfson, Sheila Freedman and Shirley Murgraff (1999)

Unaccompanied Refugee Children: Have the Lessons Been Learnt?↵ Jack Gilbert (2001)

Making a Difference: Promoting Race Equality in Secondary Schools, Youth Groups and Adult Education – a Jewish Perspective
Dr Edie Friedman (2002)

Start With a Difference: Promoting Race Equality in the Early Years—A Jewish Perspective 
Julie Taylor (2006)

Reluctant Refuge: The Story of Asylum in Britain
Dr Edie Friedman and Reva Klein (2008)

Guide for Refugee Doctors, Sixth Edition↵ Jo Waterfield & Jo Attwool (2009)

References

Jewish refugee aid organizations
Refugee aid organisations in the United Kingdom
Human rights organisations based in the United Kingdom
Jewish charities based in the United Kingdom
Jews and Judaism in the United Kingdom
Organizations established in 1976
1976 establishments in the United Kingdom